The 1972 European Formula Two season was contested over 14 rounds. British Mike Hailwood, a previously famous motorcycle racer, was the season champion, driving a Surtees-Ford.

Teams and drivers

Calendar

Note:

Race 1, 3, 6, 9, 10, 11 and 12 were held in two heats, with results shown in aggregate.

Race 2, 4, 5, 7 and 13 were held with two semi-final heats and the final run, with time only shown for the final.

Race 2, 6, 7, 9, 11 and 14 was won by a graded driver, all graded drivers are shown in Italics.

Race 3 Bert Hawthorne was fatally injured in practice.

Final point standings

Driver

For every race points were awarded: 9 points to the winner, 6 for runner-up, 4 for third place, 3 for fourth place, 2 for fifth place and 1 for sixth place. No additional points were awarded. The best 10 results count. No driver had a point deduction.

Note:

Only drivers which were not graded were able to score points.

Race 2 not all points were awarded (not enough finishers).

References

Formula Two
European Formula Two Championship seasons